Walter Pierce may refer to:

Walter E. Pierce (1860–1951), real estate developer and mayor of Boise City, Idaho
Walter M. Pierce (1861–1954), American politician and Governor of Oregon
Walter Pierce (impresario) (born 1930), American performing arts impresario
Walter Pierce (architect) (1920–2013), American modernist architect

See also
Walter Pearce (disambiguation)